Ludovic Chelle (born 3 January 1983) is a French-born Malian basketball player currently playing for JL Bourg-en-Bresse in the Ligue Nationale de Basketball. He is also a member of the Mali national basketball team.

Chelle has predominantly been a role player coming off the bench in his time in the French league.  After signing in 2001 with Olympique Antibes, Chelle has played for four teams in the league.  His best season came with Chorale Roanne Basket in 2005, averaging 8.9 points per game in 34 games.  He also participated in the FIBA EuroCup with Paris Basket Racing in 2004.

Chelle averaged 11.1 PPG during the 2009 FIBA Africa Championship in helping Mali to an eighth-place finish in the tournament.

References

1983 births
Living people
Citizens of Mali through descent
Malian men's basketball players
Shooting guards
Sportspeople from Toulouse
French men's basketball players
HTV Basket players
French sportspeople of Malian descent